Zbigniew Jerzy Lipowski, MD, (also known as Bish in North America; November 22, 1924 – December 30, 1997) was a Polish psychiatrist, historian, author, political commentator and speaker. He wrote several books in the on the topics of consultation-liaison psychiatry, delirium and psychosomatic medicine as well as hundreds of articles and reviews that have been widely published in journals such as The New England Journal of Medicine, The Journal of the American Medical Association, and the Canadian Medical Association Journal.

Lipowski was considered to be a leader in his field, and his work is still taught in medical classrooms today. He has been described as the "Walter Lippman" of the consultation-liaison psychiatric subspecialty.

Early life in WWII and education

Bish's early life was not an easy one. He saw first-hand the horrors of World War II. In Nazi-occupied Poland, between August and October 1944, Bish participated as a civilian in the Warsaw Uprising, a massive popular revolt against the German army that resulted in the deaths of more than 200,000 people. In an autobiographical essay quoted by the Toronto Star, Bish wrote that those "two months of horror were the most significant experience of my life...Not far from us were Gestapo headquarters, where some 2,000 men were shot during the uprising and their bodies were burned, so the odor of burning flesh was with us day and night...We were bombed and shelled daily, food was very scarce, and water had to be obtained at night from a well some distance away... I was so hungry as to almost hallucinate food." Eventually Bish escaped Poland with his family and made his way to Ireland. He worked hard and won a medical scholarship at the National University of Ireland in Dublin, where he graduated with honors. He eventually completed his psychiatry residency at McGill and then went on to complete a fellowship in consultation-liaison psychiatry at Massachusetts General Hospital.

Medical career
Throughout his career Bish served on many faculties, including McGill, Dartmouth, The Medical College of the University of South Carolina, and the University of Toronto. He was also active in the American Psychosomatic Society and the Academy of Psychosomatic Medicine. At annual meetings of these organizations, Bish was always at the center of a large group of colleagues who would eagerly listen to his stories and ideas.

Books and writing
Bish was a remarkable writer. His reviews in major medical journals such as The New England Journal of Medicine, The Journal of The American Medical Association, and the Canadian Medical Association Journal helped to make him a significant teacher of nonpsychiatric physicians on important areas in psychiatry.13–15 His papers were finally published as a collected work.16 This remarkable volume of papers is timeless and will offer students important information and concepts for generations.

Bish's scholarship covered three broad topics. First, he was a gifted historian in C-L psychiatry.8,9  He also had an abiding interest in and knowledge about the interface of C-L psychiatry and neurology, in particular the problem of delirium. His work in this area culminated in Delirium: Acute Confusional States, a scholarly tour de force on an important and increasingly recognized topic, but one that had been ignored by mainstream psychiatry for many years.10  Third, he furthered our knowledge about the problem of somatization. His review article in the American Journal of Psychiatry in 1988 focused on this complicated issue, and one of his last publications was as co-author of Innovative Group Therapeutic Approach to the Somatizing Patient.

Awards and praise
Dr. Lipowski was the 1991 recipient of the Academy of Psychosomatic Medicine's Hackett Award. "Bish," as he was known to friends, was a mentor to many current leaders in consultation-liaison (C-L) psychiatry. His classic triad Review of Consultation Psychiatry and Psychosomatic Medicine is as relevant today as it was three decades ago.1–3  Bish was the consummate historian and political commentator on consultation-liaison psychiatry. In this capacity, he was the "Walter Lippman" of our subspecialty.  When the American Journal of Psychiatry needed someone to write overviews of consultation psychiatry, Bish was the obvious choice.

Death
Dr. Lipowski, Emeritus Professor of Psychiatry, University of Toronto, died December 30, 1997 from ALS and associated dementia, in Toronto, Ontario, Canada at the age of 73.

References

 https://www.researchgate.net/scientific-contributions/73335277_Z_J_Lipowski

Polish psychiatrists
1924 births
1997 deaths
Clan of Ciołek
20th-century Polish physicians
Polish emigrants to Ireland
Irish expatriates in Canada
Irish expatriates in the United States